HD 213240 is a possible binary star system in the constellation Grus. It has an apparent visual magnitude of 6.81, which lies below the limit of visibility for normal human sight. The system is located at a distance of 133.5 light years from the Sun based on parallax. The primary has an absolute magnitude of 3.77.

This is an ordinary G-type main-sequence star with a stellar classification of G0/G1V. It is a metal-rich star with an age has been calculated as being anywhere from 2.7 to 4.6 billion years. The star has 1.6 times the mass of the Sun and 1.56 times the Sun's radius. It is spinning with a projected rotational velocity of 3.5 km/s. The star is radiating 2.69 times the luminosity of the Sun from its photosphere at an effective temperature of 5,921 K.

A red dwarf companion star was detected in 2005 with a projected separation of 3,898 AU.

Planetary system 
The Geneva extrasolar planet search team discovered a planet orbiting this star in 2001. There is a 5% chance this is actually a brown dwarf.

See also 
 HD 212301
 List of extrasolar planets

References

G-type main-sequence stars
Planetary systems with one confirmed planet
Binary stars
Grus (constellation)
Durchmusterung objects
213240
111143